These are the bridges in Dubai that are completed, under construction, proposed or approved.

Operation
Bridges in Dubai are operated by Dubai Roads and Transport Authority (RTA).

List of completed bridges

List of bridges under construction or Approved

 Sheikh Rashid bin Saeed Crossing, upon completion will become worlds longest arch bridge, and will become sixth crossing across Dubai Creek.
 Dubai Smile, is an approved bridge which will supersede the existing Floating Bridge, upon completion it will become seventh crossing across Dubai Creek.

 Notes
 A. Approved for construction.

All of tunnels in The United Arab Emirates

See also
 List of buildings in Dubai

References

External links
 Gulfnews.com
 Dubaiasitusedtobe.com
 Floating bridge over Dubai Creek opens Gulf News (16 July 2007)
 Pontoon will ease Maktoum bridge traffic Gulf News (17 July 2007)
 Gulfnews.com
  More information on the Business Bay Crossing
 straitstimes.com
 Popularmechanics.com
 Dubaichronicle.com
 Gulfnews.com

 01

Dubai
Lists of buildings and structures in the United Arab Emirates
Dubai
United Arab Emirates transport-related lists
Bridges